The Magdalo Para sa Pilipino Sectoral Party Organization, also known as the Magdalo Para sa Pilipino or Magdalo Party-List, is a political party in the Philippines. Magdalo seeks to represent the retired personnel of the Armed Forces of the Philippines and their families, as well as the urban poor and the youth.

The organization was established by the Samahang Magdalo on July 27, 2010, in Quezon City, Metro Manila. Samahang Magdalo itself had links to the Magdalo Group, which led the Oakwood Mutiny and Manila Peninsula siege with both efforts to remove then-President Gloria Macapagal Arroyo from her post.

The Magdalo Party-List was re-endorsed by former senator and retired navy officer Antonio "Sonny" Trillanes during the 2016 election, while he was running for the vice presidency of the Philippines.

Electoral performance

Vice president

House of Representatives party-list elections

Representatives to Congress

Notes

References

External links 
 Magdalo Party-List
 

Party-lists represented in the House of Representatives of the Philippines
Political parties established in 2010
Conservative parties in the Philippines